Kuytun or Kuitun, is a county-level city with about 285,000 residents (2000 census) in Ili Kazakh Autonomous Prefecture, Xinjiang, China. Kuitun is located between Wusu and Shihezi on the railway from Ürümqi to Kazakhstan, close to a desert.

The city was historically associated with the 7th Xinjiang Agriculture Construction Division, which had run it until 1975, and still continues to administer the city's Tianbei New Area.

Local industries include food processing and textile industries, as well as Kuitun Power Plant.

Name
The name of Kuytun was from the Mongolian language, meaning   extreme cold. The name of Kuiteng, which firstly appeared in the official historical book History of Yuan, was the present Kuytun River. According to legend, in the period of Mongolian Westward Expansion, Genghis Khan' troops once stationed in the place, when it was very cold in winter, his soldiers shouted "Kuitun", since that time, the place was named after Kuytun.

History

At the latest in the 3rd century BC (Qin dynasty), the Saka people appeared in the place of present Kuytun area. This was followed by the Great Yuezhi people and then the Usans.

Kuytun was part of Protectorate of the Western Regions (59 BC) in the Han period. During the period of the Jin, Sixteen Kingdoms and Northern and Southern dynasties, it was part of Ruipan State, then that was followed by the Northern Wei, Rouran and then the First Turkic Khaganate. It was the territory of Tyueles in Western Turk in the Sui period and of Kunling Commandery in the Tang period. It was part of Toquz Oghuz and it was followed by Liao State in the Five Dynasties and Ten Kingdoms period. The place was within the territory of Mongol Qurzh in the period of Genghis Khan (1206 - 1227), and as part of the fiefdom of Chagatai Khan' Descendants between 1306 - 1330. As the pastureland of Oirats, it was under the administration of Kurkalawusu of Dzungars in the Qing period. When Xinjiang Province was found in 1884, the army camps and fortress in the province were changed into military posts 
(), Kuytun Post was one of that in those days.

The territory was Kuytun Divion (Kuitunzhuang), one of nine divisions in Wusu County in 1913. In 1945, Wusu County was divided into four minggans (administrative Division below the county),  Kuytun was one of that. The minggan of Kuytun had five centenarii of Kuytun, Bayingou, Jiujianlou, Huanggong and Bashisihu under its administration. The security police station was found in Kuytun in 1948.

In August 1950, the administrative division of minggan  in Wusu County was transformed into a district, and a centenarii into a township. Kuytun was the 1st township of the 2nd district in Wusu County, and it had five unincorporated villages of Huanggou, Tashikuitun, Kalasu, Diankuitun and Kaiganqi under its administration.

In the further adjustment of administrative divisions in March 1954, Kuytun became the 1st township of the 1st district of Wusu County. In early 1957, The three townships of Kuytun, Bashisihu and Jiujianlou were amalgamated into Xinfu Township. In March 1957, the 7th Division of XPCC moved its headquarters to Kuytun from Paotai.

In July 1958, Kuytun was incorporated to Karamay from Wushi County. On March 25, 1975, the XPCC was withdrawn, the 7th Division with agriculture and animal husbandry farms, and its owned industrial enterprises were devolved to the local administration. On August 29, 1975, the county-level city of Kuytun was approved to establish from Karamay by the State Council, and it was under administration of Ili Autonomous Prefecture. On September 10 of the same year, Kuitun City was officially established and the seat of Ili Autonomous Prefecture was moved to Kuytun from Yining. Based on agriculture and animal husbandry farms, and industrial enterprises owned by the 7th Division of XPCC, Kuytun Bureau of Farms and Land Reclamation was incorporated in July 1978. Kuytun City and the Kuytun Bureau of Farms and Land Reclamation were implemented a team with two brands. The seat of Ili Autonomous Prefecture was moved back to Yining from Kuytun in October 1979.

The XPCC was approved to restore in December 1981. Based on the Kuytun Bureau of Farms and Land Reclamation which was revoked, the 7th Division of XPCC was restored in April 1982. The 7th Division of XPCC and local government of Kuytun City are independent of each other, the 7th Division of XPCC is under unified command of XPCC meanwhile Kuytun City is under the administration of Ili Autonomous Prefecture.

Geography 
The city of Kuytun is located in the middle northwest of Xinjiang Uygur Autonomous Region, with a north latitude of 44 degrees 19 degrees - 44 degrees 49 degrees and an east longitude of 84 degrees 47 degrees - 85 degrees 18 degrees. It is bordered by Shawan County to the east, by Dushanzi District to the south, by Wusu City to the west and by Karamay District to the north. The maximum length north–south is about 46 kilometers, the maximum is about 33 kilometers between east and west and the total area is 1,171.42 square kilometers.

Kuytun City lies in the northern side of Tianshan, the southwest edge of the Junggar Basin and the Kuytun River valley. Its terrain of the city is tilted from southwest to northeast at an altitude of 450–530 meters. It is the Tianshan fold belt with multi-Gobi gravel in the south, the edge of the platform of Junggar Basin in the north. and there are more water furrows in the west of downtown. The water sources are the Kuytun River and Quangou Reservoir. The region is in a moderate temperate continental arid climate, hot in summer and cold in winter, rainless. The four seasons are more distinct, the average annual temperature is 7.4 °C and the average annual rainfall of 182 mm.

Population and ethnic groups
As of 2015, There was  a population of 289,397 in Kuytun City, accounting for 6.16% of Ili Autonomous Prefecture's population. Of that, minority population of 15,768, accounting for  5.45% of Kuytun and Han population of 273,629, accounting for 94.55%. The main minorities are Hui, Kazak, Mongols and Uyghur in the city. The Hui population was 6,364, accounting for 2.2%, Kazakhs of 5,222, accounting for 1.8%, Mongols of 1,059, Uyghurs of 1,018 and others of 2,105.

Administrative divisions
As of 2018, the city of Kuytun is divided into five subdistircts, a township, 131th Regiment of XPCC and Tianbei New Area.

 Tuanjielu Subdistirct
 Wudonglu Subdistirct
 Beijinglu Subdistirct
 Wulumuqixilu Subdistirct
 Huochezhan Subdistirct
 Kaiganqi Township
 131th Regiment of the XPCC
 Tianbei New Area

Transport 
Kuytun is the largest material transit, distribution and transportation hub in the Northern Xinjiang area, the G30 and G3014 National Expressways, G312 and G217 National Highways meet here. It is a railway junction for the Northern Xinjiang, Second Ürümqi-Jinghe and Kuytun-Beitun Railways.

External links 
 Kuitun City Government 
 Kuitun City info 
 Kuitun Map

References 

County-level divisions of Xinjiang
Ili Kazakh Autonomous Prefecture
Xinjiang Production and Construction Corps
Populated places in Xinjiang